Héctor Luis Silva (1 July 1945 – 17 May 2021) was an Argentine rugby union footballer and coach, who coached Argentina in the 1987 Rugby World Cup.

Biography 
Between 14 and 18 years, he played rugby and basketball; he practiced rugby in the youth team of his city, Rugby Club Los Tilos from La Plata, and at 18 years he was in the first team; at 20 years, in 1965, he debuted for Argentina in a test match against the Junior Springboks in South Africa, during a tour which saw 11 wins in 16 matches.

Becoming captain for Argentina in 1967, he was excluded from the national team in 1971 due to Silva accepting to appear in a television advertisement; even if he was not formally suspended, he was not called up until 1977.

In 1980, he was part of the South America XV which took part in South Africa and ended his international career in August against a World XV in Buenos Aires.

Three years later he took the lead of Tilos and later he was called to coach  Argentina national team alongside Ángel Guastella; the coaches were sacked after Argentina failed to make the knock-out stage in the 1987 Rugby World Cup.

He continued his coaching activity parallel to his role in the public administration, and occasionally he collaborated as sports consultant and commentator for press headlines.

Death
Héctor Silva died on 17 May 2021, aged 75 or 76, from COVID-19 at a hospital in La Plata, where he was admitted two weeks prior.

Notes

External links 

Argentine rugby union coaches
Argentina national rugby union team coaches
1945 births
Argentine rugby union players
Sportspeople from La Plata
2021 deaths
Argentina international rugby union players
Deaths from the COVID-19 pandemic in Argentina
Rugby union number eights